Ib Frederiksen is a former Danish badminton player.

Career
Frederiksen competed at the 1987 IBF World Championships, and he was defeated in the quarterfinals by Yang Yang, of China. He won the 1988 All England Open Badminton Championships in men's singles beating Jens Peter Nierhoff in the semifinal and Morten Frost in the final 8–15, 15–7, 15–10.

Achievements

European Championships 
Men's singles

IBF World Grand Prix 
The World Badminton Grand Prix sanctioned by International Badminton Federation (IBF) from 1983 to 2006.

Men's singles

External links 
Ib Frederiksen's Profile - Badminton.dk

1964 births
Living people
Danish male badminton players